The 2008 FINA Diving World Cup was held in Beijing, China and was a test event for the new Beijing Aquatics Center (Water Cube), as well as a qualifying event for 2008 Summer Olympics in Beijing.

Summary of Events
China won all but one Discipline at the 2008 World Cup.
Germany's Sascha Klien won the Ten Meter Platform (the only title China didn't get).

Medal table

Men

Women

References
 About.com: "FINA Diving World Cup Results"

External links
 www.fina.org/

FINA Diving World Cup
Fina Diving World Cup
Fina Diving World Cup
Diving competitions in China
Sports competitions in Beijing
International aquatics competitions hosted by China